The 1916 Oklahoma A&M Aggies football team represented Oklahoma A&M College in the 1916 college football season. This was the 16th year of football at A&M and the second under John G. Griffith. The Aggies played their home games at Lewis Field in Stillwater, Oklahoma. They finished the season 4–4, 0–3 in the Southwest Conference.

Schedule

References

Oklahoma AandM
Oklahoma State Cowboys football seasons
Oklahoma AandM